Prince George-Mackenzie is a provincial electoral district in British Columbia, Canada established by the Electoral Districts Act, 2008.  It came into effect upon the dissolution of the BC Legislature in April 2009, and was first contested in the 2009 provincial election.

Geography
As of the 2020 provincial election, Prince George-Mackenzie comprises the northern portion of the Regional District of Fraser-Fort George, located in central British Columbia. The electoral district contains the community of Mackenzie and the northwestern portion of Prince George.  The boundary line within the city of Prince George comes from the east following along the Fraser, and then the Nechako River to the John Hart Bridge where it goes south along Highway 97, west along Massey Drive, south along Ospika Boulevard until Ferry Avenue. The boundary then cuts west to just south of the University of Northern British Columbia before traveling south down Tyner Boulevard, then follows Highway 16 out of the city to the west.

History

Election results

References 

British Columbia provincial electoral districts
Politics of Prince George, British Columbia